Teatro João Caetano is a theatre in Rio de Janeiro, Brazil. Established in 1813, it was the first official theatre in Rio.

References 

Theatres in Rio de Janeiro (city)
1813 establishments in Brazil